Lenrie Leopold Wilfred Peters (1 September 1932 – 28 May 2009) was a Gambian surgeon, novelist, poet and educationist.

Biography
Peters was born in 1931 in Bathurst (now Banjul) in The Gambia. His parents were Lenrie Ernest Ingram Peters and Kezia Rosemary. Lenrie Sr. was a Sierra Leone Creole of West Indian or black American origin. Kezia Rosemary was a Gambian Creole of Sierra Leonean Creole origin. Lenrie Jr. grew up in Bathurst and moved to Sierra Leone in 1949, where he was educated at the Prince of Wales School, Freetown, gaining his Higher School Certificate in science subjects.

In 1952 he went up to Trinity College, Cambridge, to read Natural Sciences, graduating with a BSc degree in 1956; from 1956 to 1959 he worked and studied at University College Hospital, London, and 1959 was awarded a Medical and Surgery diploma from Cambridge. Peters worked for the BBC from 1955 to 1968, on their Africa programmes.

While at Cambridge University he was elected president of the African Students' Union, and interested himself in Pan-Africanist politics. He also began writing poetry and plays, as well as starting work on his only novel, The Second Round (published by Heinemann in 1965). Peters worked in hospitals in Guildford and Northampton before returning to the Gambia, where he had a surgical practice in Banjul. He was a fellow of the West African College of Surgeons and the Royal College of Surgeons in England.

Peters was President of the Historic Commission of Monuments of the Gambia, was president of the board of directors of the National Library of the Gambia and The Gambia College from 1979 to 1987, and was a member and President of the West African Examination Council (WAEC) from 1985 to 1991.

He died in Dakar, Senegal, in 2009, aged 76.

Published works

Poetry
1964: Poems (Ibadan: Mbari Publications)
1967: Satellites (London: Heinemann, African Writers Series No. 37)
1971: Katchikali (London: Heinemann, African Writers Series No. 103)  ; 
1981: Selected Poetry (London: Heinemann, African Writers Series No. 238) 
1984: A New Book of African Verse

Novels
1965: The Second Round (London: Heinemann, African Writers Series No. 22)

References

1932 births
2009 deaths
Gambian Creole people
Gambian Christians
Alumni of Trinity College, Cambridge
Gambian surgeons
Gambian novelists
Gambian poets
People of Sierra Leone Creole descent
People from Banjul
20th-century poets
20th-century novelists
20th-century surgeons